Hamadryas epinome, the epinome cracker, is a species of butterfly believed to have originated from Paraguay and also found in a number of other South American countries including Argentina, Brazil, Peru, and Uruguay.

References

External links
 Image
 

Hamadryas (butterfly)
Nymphalidae of South America
Lepidoptera of Brazil
Butterflies described in 1867
Taxa named by Baron Cajetan von Felder
Taxa named by Rudolf Felder